Fuego is an album by American trumpeter Donald Byrd recorded in 1959 and released on the Blue Note label in 1960 as BLP 4026, featuring Byrd with Jackie McLean, Duke Pearson, Doug Watkins and Lex Humphries.

Reception
The Allmusic review by Michael G. Nastos awarded the album 4 stars and stated "hard bop is at the core of this band, but Byrd is moving further into post-bop... as he takes a break from forceful interaction to play a more democratic role on this refined and mature album that is less brash, a prelude for his more powerful statements yet to come". The Penguin Guide to Jazz praised McLean's contributions but criticized the uninteresting compositions.

Track listing
All compositions by Donald Byrd

 "Fuego" - 6:38
 "Bup a Loup" - 4:05
 "Funky Mama" - 10:58
 "Low Life" - 6:02
 "Lament" - 8:27
 "Amen" - 4:46

Personnel
Donald Byrd - trumpet
Jackie McLean - alto saxophone
Duke Pearson - piano
Doug Watkins - bass
Lex Humphries - drums

References

1960 albums
Albums recorded at Van Gelder Studio
Blue Note Records albums
Donald Byrd albums
Hard bop albums